"Chandramouli Velpula" is a famous graphic designer in South India. 
Chandramouli is an Indian given name:

 Kalluri Chandramouli, was a freedom fighter, philanthropist, scholar and a great devotee.
 Lakshmi Priyaa Chandramouli, is a Tamil film and television actress.
 Varkapur Chandramouli, was an Indian Maoist leader

Indian given names